WBFD (1310 AM) is a News/Talk/Sports formatted broadcast radio station licensed to Bedford, Pennsylvania, serving Bedford and Bedford County, Pennsylvania.  WBFD is owned and operated by Cessna Communications, Inc.

WBFD also broadcasts on FM translator W254DF on 98.7 MHz in Bedford, Pennsylvania.

References

External links
 NewsTalk 1310 WBFD Online

1955 establishments in Pennsylvania
News and talk radio stations in the United States
Sports radio stations in the United States
Radio stations established in 1955
BFD